Cow and Chicken is an American animated comedy television series created by David Feiss. It follows the surreal adventures of two cartoon animal siblings, Cow and Chicken. They are often antagonized by the Red Guy, a cartoon version of the Devil who poses as various characters to scam them.

The pilot episode originally aired as part of Cartoon Network series What a Cartoon on November 12, 1995. The series later made its official debut as a Cartoon Cartoon on July 22, 1997, and ended on August 13, 1999 with a total of 52 episodes (104 segments) over the course of 4 seasons. Cow and Chicken was attached to another segment called I Am Weasel, which was later spun off into its own half-hour series on June 10, 1999.

The series creator David Feiss directed all the episodes, with the co-directions of Monte Young, John McIntyre, and Robert Alvarez.

Series overview

Episodes

Pilot (1995)

Season 1 (1997) 
This season was produced from November 1996 to June 1997.

Season 2 (1998) 
13 half-hours of this season were produced from December 1997 to March 1998. 13 more half-hours were produced from July to November 1998, splitting off into a third season.

Season 3 (1998–99)

Season 4 (1999) 
Episodes 40, 42–44, & 48 were shown as part of a special promotion called "Smelly Telly", where viewers could use scratch and sniff cards to smell certain odors at different parts of the episodes, as instructed on screen.

See also 
 List of I Am Weasel episodes

Notes

References

External links 
 
 

Lists of American children's animated television series episodes
Lists of Cartoon Network television series episodes